The Battle of Union Gap, or the Battle at Union Gap, was the second engagement of the Yakama War, fought on November 9 and 10, 1855.  It began when a large force of about 700 American soldiers, under Major Gabriel J. Rains, discovered Chief Kamiakin's village of around 300 braves and several women and children, along the Yakima River. In the following two-day battle only one "non-combatant" was killed by accident and the Yakama men were forced to retreat with their women and children.

See also
 Cayuse War
 Whitman Massacre

References

 

Union
Union
Union
Union
Union
Union
Union Gap
November 1855 events